Sharpe is a series of historical fiction stories by Bernard Cornwell centred on the character of British soldier Richard Sharpe. The stories formed the basis for an ITV television series featuring Sean Bean in the title role.

Cornwell's series is composed of many novels and several short stories, and charts Sharpe's progress in the British Army during the Napoleonic Wars, though the novels were published in non-chronological order. He begins in Sharpe's Tiger as a private in the 33rd Regiment of Foot who is continually promoted, finally rising to lieutenant colonel in Sharpe's Waterloo. His military career ends with the final defeat of Napoleon, but he has more adventures as a civilian.

Sharpe is born to a whore in the rookeries of London. Orphaned at an early age, he grows up in poverty. He is eventually taken in by prostitute (and later bar owner) Maggie Joyce and becomes a thief. He has to flee the city after killing a man to protect Maggie.

Enlisting in the army, he is promoted to sergeant as a reward for completing a highly dangerous spying mission in India. He is made an officer, an ensign, when he saves the life of his commanding officer, Arthur Wellesley (the future Duke of Wellington), during the Battle of Assaye. It is a mixed blessing, as he constantly has to fight class prejudice in an army where an officer's rank is often purchased without regard to qualification. Cornwell sees to it that he is improbably present at many important battles of the British Empire at the end of the 18th century and the beginning of the 19th, including the Battle of Waterloo.

Sharpe is described as "brilliant but wayward" in Sharpe's Sword, and he is portrayed by the author as a "loose cannon". He becomes a highly skilled and experienced leader of light troops. In contrast to the honourable Horatio Hornblower, the inspiration for the series, Sharpe is a rogue, an unabashed thief and murderer who has no qualms about killing a bitter enemy when the opportunity arises. However, he is protective of women in general and has a number of lovers over the course of his life.

He is six feet tall, with an angular, tanned face, long black hair, and blue eyes. He has a deep scar on his right cheek which pulls at his right eye, giving his face a mocking expression when relaxed; this disappears when he smiles, which is not too frequently. By the end of the series, he has had two wives and three children.

Inspiration
Cornwell had enjoyed C. S. Forester's Horatio Hornblower novels, which depict a Royal Navy officer's career from midshipman to Admiral of the Fleet and retirement. When he could not find a similar series for the British Army, he decided to write it himself. As a further inducement, he fell in love with an American woman who, for various reasons, could not leave the United States, so he relocated. He could not get a green card or work permit, so he wrote the first Sharpe novel to make a living.

Struggling to come up with a name as distinctive as Horatio Hornblower, he used a placeholder based on the rugby union player Richard Sharp; eventually, he kept it, just adding an "e". The author had intended to write 11 novels, the same number as in the Hornblower series, ending with Sharpe's Waterloo, but later changed his mind and continued writing.

Sean Bean
Sean Bean played Sharpe in the British television series Sharpe. Cornwell was so impressed with Bean's portrayal that he expanded Sharpe's backstory to have him growing up in Yorkshire to account for Bean's accent. The author also avoided further mention of Sharpe's black hair (Bean's hair being blond).

Early years
Richard Sharpe is born in London circa 1777 (he believes that he may be 22 during the early months of 1799) to a prostitute residing in "Cat Lane" and possibly a French smuggler. When Sharpe is three, his mother is killed in the Gordon Riots.

With no other known relatives to claim him, Sharpe is deposited in Jem Hocking's foundling home at Brewhouse Lane, Wapping, where he spends his days picking his assigned quota of oakum. He is malnourished and regularly beaten, resulting in his being undersized for his age. Because of this, he is eventually sold to a master chimney sweep to train as an apprentice at the relatively late age of 12. Fearing the high mortality rate among apprentice sweeps (who are forced to climb inside chimneys and remove soot by hand), Sharpe flees to the Rookery, a slum in St Giles, and is taken in by prostitute (and later bar owner) Maggie Joyce. He stays under Maggie's protection for three years, learning various forms of thieving. Maggie is his first lover.

After killing a gang leader during a fight over Maggie, he flees from London to Yorkshire at the age of fifteen. He works in a tavern in Sheffield. Within six months, Sharpe kills a second man, the landlord of the tavern where he is working, in a fight over a local girl. 

To avoid arrest, Sharpe takes the "King's shilling", joining the 33rd Foot, as a result of the blandishments of recruiting sergeant Obadiah Hakeswill. The regiment is first sent to Flanders in 1794, where Sharpe fights in his first battle, at Boxtel. The next year, he and his regiment are posted to India, under the command of the British East India Company.

India
In 1799, Sergeant Hakeswill goads Sharpe into striking him. Sharpe is sentenced to 2,000 lashes (effectively a death sentence), but is released after only 200 by executive order (Sharpe's Tiger). He is assigned to accompany Lieutenant William Lawford on a secret mission to rescue Lawford's uncle, Colonel Hector McCandless, the head of British East India Company intelligence. They join Tipu Sultan's army, posing as British deserters, but are later exposed and imprisoned. Lawford teaches Sharpe to read and write whilst they languish in Tipu's dungeon. Sharpe escapes during the siege of Seringapatam and prematurely detonates a mine meant to devastate the British army. The British enter the city through the breach Sharpe has provided. He then kills the fleeing Tipu unobserved during the fighting and loots a fortune in jewels from the corpse. He is promoted to sergeant for his efforts.

Sharpe serves four uneventful years as a sergeant. In 1803, he is the sole survivor of a massacre of the garrison of a small fort carried out by a turncoat Company officer, William Dodd (Sharpe's Triumph). Because he can identify Dodd, Sharpe is taken along by McCandless on a mission to capture and punish Dodd, to discourage others from deserting. Their search takes them first to battles at Ahmednuggur and then Assaye. 

At Assaye, the greatly outnumbered British force is commanded by Arthur Wellesley (the future Duke of Wellington). When Wellesley's orderly is killed, by chance Sharpe is the only one available to take his place, and so is at hand when Wellesley is unhorsed alone and among the enemy.  Sharpe single-handedly saves the general's life, killing about half a dozen enemy soldiers and holding the rest at bay until help arrives. Wellesley rewards him with a battlefield commission as an ensign for his act of bravery, though Wellesley doubts it will turn out well. Sharpe joins the 74th Regiment.

Sharpe receives a cold welcome from many of his fellow officers, who dislike him due to his low birth, as well as the common soldiers, and he has great difficulty adjusting to his new status and role. In the end, the commander of the 74th pressures him to transfer to the newly formed 95th Rifles Regiment. Before leaving India, he takes part in the assault on Gawilghur, leading troops in action for the first time. Sharpe finds a way into the nearly impregnable fortress, ignoring the orders of his cowardly commanding officer. Once inside, he confronts and kills Dodd, at the cost of a scar on his right cheek (Sharpe's Fortress).

Campaigns in Europe
While sailing from India to England to take up his post in the 95th Rifles, in 1805, Sharpe is caught up in the Battle of Trafalgar, his first direct encounter with Napoleonic France as an infantry officer. On the journey, he meets and falls in love with Lady Grace Hale, the wife of an ambitious and powerful politician, the much older Lord William Hale (Sharpe's Trafalgar). During the sea battle, Lord Hale confronts his wife, having discovered her infidelity. She is forced to kill him in self-defence. Sharpe has the body taken on deck so that it will appear as if Lord Hale died in the fighting. 

Grace sets up home with Sharpe at Shorncliffe, but dies giving birth to their child, who survives her by only a few hours. Sharpe's fortune is seized by the lawyers, who believe it to be part of Grace's estate.  

He falls into a deep depression, worsened by his bad relationship with his commanding officer, who relegates him to the role of quartermaster. He is left behind when the regiment is posted to the Baltic in 1807. Sharpe, unable to sell his commission (due to it not having been purchased), considers deserting. 

He returns to Wapping and robs and kills Jem Hocking, the abusive master of the foundling home where Sharpe was raised. He fortuitously encounters General David Baird, a former colleague from India. Baird recruits him to protect John Lavisser, a Foreign Office agent being sent to secretly negotiate with the Danish Crown Prince to keep the Danish fleet out of French hands. Lavisser betrays Sharpe, who goes into hiding in Copenhagen. He witnesses the British bombardment of the city and the capture of the Danish fleet (Sharpe's Prey). Sharpe considers settling down there, having fallen in love with Astrid, the daughter of Ole Skovgaard, the chief spy for the British in Denmark. However, Skovgaard turns against the British because of their attack, and Astrid obeys his order to break up with Sharpe.

By early 1809, Sharpe is in Spain with the 95th Rifles, his men serving as the rearguard of the retreat to Corunna. When Captain Murray is mortally wounded, he leaves his heavy cavalry sword to Sharpe, giving him his signature weapon, used in all the subsequent books. Cut off from the main body of the army, he is forced to take command of a handful of surviving but mutinous riflemen (including future best friend Patrick Harper), while protecting a small party of English missionaries. He encounters Spanish Major Blas Vivar and his partisans and unwillingly helps them temporarily seize control of the city of Santiago de Compostela so that Vivar can raise a sacred gonfalon to bolster the Spanish people's flagging morale (Sharpe's Rifles). Sharpe's surviving riflemen who begin the retreat to Corunna are:

 Rfn Daniel Hagman (Sharpe's Rifles - Sharpe's Waterloo)
 Rfn Hobbes (Sharpe's Revenge)
 Rfn Harris (Sharpe's Prey - Sharpe's Christmas) (alive)
 Rfn Ben Perkins (Sharpe's Rifles - Sharpe's Christmas) (alive)
 Rfn Francis Cooper (Sharpe's Prey - Sharpe's Christmas) (alive)
 Rfn Parry Jenkins (Sharpe's Rifles - Sharpe's Sword) (alive)
 Rfn Green (Sharpe's Battle - Sharpe's Company) (alive) 
 Rfn McDonald (Sharpe's Battle -  Sharpe's Company) (alive)
 Rfn Smith (Sharpe's Battle -  Sharpe's Company) (alive)
 Rfn Christopher Cresacre (Sharpe's Havoc - Sharpe's Company)
 Rfn Jebediah Horrell  (Sharpe's Eagle - Sharpe's Battle) (alive)
 Rfn Nicholas Hine (Sharpe's Havoc) - (Sharpe's Battle) (alive)
 Rfn Thompson (Sharpe's Battle)
 Rfn Finn (Sharpe's Battle) (alive)
 Rfn Cameron (Sharpe's Rifles - Sharpe's Battle) (alive)
 Rfn Sims (Sharpe's Rifles - Sharpe's Battle) (alive)
 Rfn Tobias Moore (Sharpe's Honour - Sharpe's Battle) (alive)
 Rfn Bradshaw (Sharpe's Gold - Sharpe's Battle) (alive)
 Rfn Millerson (Sharpe's Battle)  (alive)
 Rfn Fergus Slattery (Sharpe's Havoc - Sharpe's Fury)
 Rfn McNeill (Sharpe's Havoc - Sharpe's Escape) (alive)
 Rfn Carter (Sharpe's Havoc) - (Sharpe's Escape) (alive)
 Rfn Harvey (Sharpe's Rifles - Sharpe's Escape) (alive)
 Rfn Skillicorn (Sharpe's Gold)
 Rfn Isaiah Tongue (Sharpe's Rifles - Sharpe's Gold)
 Rfn Pendleton (Sharpe's Havoc - Sharpe's Eagle)
 Rfn Gataker (Sharpe's Rifles - Sharpe's Eagle) 
 Rfn John Williamson (Sharpe's Rifles - Sharpe's Havoc) (traitor) 
 Rfn Ned Tarrant (Sharpe's Rifles - Sharpe's Havoc) (missing in action)
 Rfn Sean Donnelly (Sharpe's Rifles - Sharpe's Havoc)
 Cpl Matthew Dodd (Sharpe's Rifles - Sharpe's Escape) (missing in action)
 Sgt Latimer (Sharpe's Battle  - Sharpe's Company) (alive)
 Sgt Williams (Sharpe's Rifles)
 RSM Patrick Harper (Sharpe's Prey - Sharpe's Devil) (alive)

After making their way to Portugal, and taking part in the Battle of the Douro, Sharpe and his surviving 30 riflemen are attached to the Light Company of the South Essex Regiment (a fictional regiment) as part of Wellesley's Peninsula Army. Some of the men Sharpe commanded in the South Essex are:

 Pte Peters (alive)
 Pte Kirby (alive)
 Pte Gutteridge (alive)
 Pte Roach (alive)
 Pte Batten (alive)
 Pte Clayton (killed at Waterloo)
 Pte Dobbs (alive)
 Pte Mellors (alive)
 Pte Farrell (alive) 
 Pte Paddock (alive)
 Pte Angel (alive)
 Cpl Jackson (alive)
 Sgt Read
 Sgt McGivern (alive)
 Sgt Huckfield (lost a finger at Waterloo)
 Sgt Charlie Weller (alive)
 Sgt Obadiah Hakeswill (executed for his many war crimes)
 RSM Maclaird
 Ens Denny
 Ens Mattews (murdered by Hakeswill)
 Ens Collip (alive)
 Ens Jack Bullen
 Ens Iliffe
 Ens McDonald
 Lt Michael Trumper-Jones (alive) 
 Cpt Robert Knowles (murdered by Obadiah Hakeswill)
 Cpt Carline (killed at Waterloo)  
 Cpt Smith (killed at Waterloo)  
 Maj Harry Price (alive) 
 Maj Peter D'Alembord. (loses a leg at Waterloo)

Sharpe takes part in a number of notable actions, either with the South Essex, or on detached duty for Wellesley's spymaster, Captain Michael Hogan of the Royal Engineers. These include capturing a French Imperial Eagle at the Battle of Talavera in 1809 (fulfilling a promise to the dying Captain Lennox), and the storming of the breach at Badajoz. He also takes an active role in the first siege of Almeida, the battles of Bussaco, Barossa, Ciudad Rodrigo, Fuentes de Onoro, Salamanca, Vitoria, and Toulouse.

Over this period, he rises in rank from lieutenant to captain to major, eventually taking unofficial command of the entire regiment. In parallel, Sharpe's Irish friend Harper rises from rifleman to regimental sergeant major.

His intelligence work for Wellesley brings him the long-lasting enmity of the fictional French spymaster Pierre Ducos, who conspires several times to destroy Sharpe's career, reputation or life.

Prior to the Battle of Waterloo, Sharpe is appointed aide to the Prince of Orange, with the rank of lieutenant colonel. Disgusted by the Prince's dangerous incompetence during the course of the battle, Sharpe deserts his post (making an attempt on the prince's life afterwards), but comes to the aid of his old regiment, steadying the line and preventing a French breakthrough. Wellesley then gives him command of the unit for the remainder of the battle (Sharpe's Waterloo).

Following Napoleon's defeat, Sharpe ends up in Paris with the occupying allied armies. There he uncovers and defeats a secret Bonapartist group (Sharpe's Assassin). Afterwards, he retires from the army.

Retirement
In 1820, Sharpe, living as a farmer in Normandy, is commissioned by the Countess of Mouromorto to find her husband, Don Blas Vivar, who has disappeared in the Spanish colony of Chile; both she and her husband had become acquainted with Sharpe in 1809, during the events leading up to the assault on Santiago de Compostella. Sharpe and Patrick Harper travel to South America. En route, they meet Napoleon, in exile on Saint Helena, who makes Sharpe an unwitting accomplice to his escape plot. Sharpe becomes entangled in Lord Cochrane's risky schemes on behalf of the rebels in the Chilean War of Independence. In the end, he finds Blas Vivar alive, and Napoleon dies before he can escape.

Equipment
During the earliest (chronological) books Sharpe is a private and later sergeant, and so his uniform and weapons largely are in line with Army regulations. His first sword and officer's sash are taken from the dead in the wake of the Battle of Assaye, although no specifics are given on the weapon.

By the time of Sharpe's Prey as a junior rifle officer, although carrying a regulation Pattern 1796 light cavalry sabre, Sharpe has begun carrying a Baker rifle as well, and is noted to prefer a heavier sword like the cutlass used by the Navy, as the point of the curved sabre was never where he expected it to be and also lacked the weight to block attacks from a musket and bayonet in close-quarter battles.

In Sharpe's Rifles, Sharpe acquires his other signature weapon. Captain Murray, mortally wounded in the Corunna retreat, leaves his Pattern 1796 heavy cavalry sword to him, a replacement for the sword that broke in the battle.  From a French chasseur Harper kills, Sharpe takes his overalls and boots. Sharpe continues to wear his green jacket even whilst serving in a regular infantry battalion out of pride, as do Harper and all of the other elite riflemen. As Sharpe, like the majority of his men, also acquires a French ox-hide pack in place of the inferior British one he is originally issued, more of his equipment is French than British. 

Sharpe also possesses a fine telescope made by Matthew Berge, a gift from Wellington for saving his life in the Battle of Assaye. It is inscribed "In Gratitude, AW.  September 23rd 1803."  It is destroyed by Pierre Ducos in Sharpe's Honour, but he is given another that belonged to Joseph Bonaparte, which he carries until Sharpe's Revenge when it is confiscated after Sharpe's arrest. This is in turn replaced by a sea captain's telescope.

In Sharpe's Assassin, immediately after the Battle of Waterloo, Sharpe buries his rifle with rifleman Daniel Hagman and takes Hagman's-a better weapon-as his own. He is later bestowed the Order of Saint Vladimir (2nd class), which was given to Wellington by Emperor Alexander I of Russia. It was first offered to a cavalry colonel who turned it down, so Wellington gives it to Sharpe.

Relationships and family
Sharpe, the son of a prostitute, has almost no memory of his mother, and no knowledge of his father. The author, Bernard Cornwell, in answer to a query on his website, wrote a riddle which he claims contains the father's identity: "Take you out, put me in and a horse appears in this happy person!".  Bernard later announced on his website that Sharpe's father was a French smuggler, and that is all he "knows".

Sharpe is both a romantic and a womanizer. In Sharpe's Rifles, Harper notes that "He'll fall in love with anything in a petticoat. I've seen his type before. Got the sense of a half-witted sheep when it comes to women."

In India, Sharpe asks for permission to marry Mary Bickerstaff, who later leaves him (Sharpe's Tiger); he also has a brief affair with Simone Joubert, who bolts with gems he left with her for safekeeping (Sharpe's Triumph, Sharpe's Fortress).

His relationship with Lady Grace Hale in 1805 has a more lasting impact; the death of his first child, who succumbs only a few hours after Grace dies in childbirth, leaves Sharpe deeply distressed. In Copenhagen, Sharpe falls in love with Astrid Skovgaard, the daughter of an important Danish spy for the British. However, after the British naval attack on Copenhagen, her father refuses to let her marry him. After Sharpe leaves, she and her father are murdered by British spymaster Lord Pumphrey (Sharpe's Trafalgar, Sharpe's Prey), as their loyalty has become suspect.

During the early years of the Peninsula Campaign, Sharpe's affections are torn between a Portuguese courtesan, Josefina LaCosta, and the Spanish partisan leader Teresa Moreno (Sharpe's Eagle, Sharpe's Gold). Teresa bears Sharpe a daughter, Antonia (Sharpe's Company), in 1811, and marries Sharpe in 1812, but is murdered a year later by Sharpe's longtime enemy, deserter Obadiah Hakeswill (Sharpe's Enemy). Sharpe leaves his daughter to be raised by Teresa's family, and, as far as is known, never sees her again.

Over the same period, Sharpe also has affairs with an English governess, Sarah Fry (Sharpe's Escape); Caterina Veronica Blazquez, a prostitute who has beguiled Henry Wellesley, Sir Arthur's brother (Sharpe's Fury); and the French spy Hélène Leroux (Sharpe's Sword, Sharpe's Honour).

For some years, Sharpe carries a small portrait of Jane Gibbons, taken after murdering her brother (Sharpe's Eagle). In 1813, he returns to England to fetch replacements, and meets, elopes with, and marries Jane (Sharpe's Regiment).  Sharpe remains faithful to his second wife, until, when Sharpe is falsely accused of theft and murder, she embarks on an adulterous affair with Sharpe's former friend Lord John Rossendale and steals the fortune Sharpe had accumulated and entrusted to her. It is while searching for evidence to clear his name that Sharpe meets and falls in love with Lucille Castineau (nee Lassan), the widow of a French officer killed in Russia (Sharpe's Revenge, Sharpe's Waterloo).

Although unable to marry while Jane lives, Sharpe settles with Lucille on her family estate in Normandy and raises two children, Patrick-Henri, who becomes a French cavalry officer (and a character in Bernand Cornwell's The Starbuck Chronicles), and Dominique, who ultimately marries an English aristocrat.

By 1861, Patrick-Henri, then a colonel in the Imperial Guard Cavalry observing the Union and Confederate armies during the American Civil War, mentions that his mother is "very lonely", so it may be assumed that Sharpe has died sometime before that date. (The Sharpe Companion gives Sharpe's year of death as 1860, though this is never stated in any of the books.) This is contradicted in the television adaptation Sharpe's Challenge, set in 1817, in which Sharpe states that Lucille has already died.

Promotions

Historical achievements
Sharpe is often portrayed as the driving force in a number of pivotal historical events. Cornwell admits to taking license with history, placing Sharpe in the place of another man whose identity is lost to history or sometimes "stealing another man's thunder." Such accomplishments include:

 Disabling a booby trap laid for the British soldiers assaulting Seringapatam (Cornwell points out in the novel's historical note that there never actually was such a booby trap, and the event was based on a British shell that struck a magazine in the city days earlier);
 Killing Tipu Sultan and looting his corpse (the identity of the man who killed the sultan is unknown; like Sharpe, the soldier probably wished to remain anonymous because of the riches he acquired);
 Saving Arthur Wellesley's life at the Battle of Assaye (Wellesley was unhorsed and forced to defend himself from Maratha artillerymen for a few crucial moments; Cornwell notes that if any soldier or officer had saved his life during this fight, he would almost certainly have rewarded him with a promotion);
 Storming the walls of the inner fortress at Gawilghur and opening the gates to the besieging forces (in reality, this was achieved by Captain Campbell leading the light company of the 94th Scotch Brigade; in the novel, Campbell and his troops are the first to join Sharpe once they realise what he's planning);
 Preventing the Danish fleet from being set on fire during the Second battle of Copenhagen (while the order to set the fleet on fire was given, it is unknown why it was never carried out);
 Finding the boats that allowed Wellesley's forces to ambush Marshal Nicolas Soult's forces at the Second Battle of Porto (Cornwell notes that in reality a Portuguese barber approached the British forces of his own volition rather than being sent across by Sharpe);
 Being the first British soldier to capture an Imperial Eagle, at the Battle of Talavera (in reality, the first French Eagle captured by the British was by Ensign Edward Keogh and Sergeant Patrick Masterson at the Battle of Barrossa in 1811);
 Successfully assaulting the central breach at Badajoz (according to Cornwell's historical note, the central breech remained largely unused during the assault);
 Destroying the Army of Deserters and taking their leader "Marshal Pot-au-Feu" Deron captive (Cornwell notes that the historic Deserters' Army was finally destroyed by the French, though they did hand British deserters over, as shown in the novel);
 Deliberately triggering the massive explosion that destroyed the fortress of Almeida (usually attributed to accident, combined with careless British handling of their munitions store);
 Retrieving and restoring the Imperial Family's treasure (in his note, Cornwell notes that several chests of personal belongings and riches did get lost in the chaos of the French defeat of 1814, but how this happened and their final fate are unknown)
 Carrying the news of Napoleon's invasion of Belgium to Wellington at the Duchess of Richmond's ball, during the Waterloo campaign (historically the bearer of the message was one of the Prince of Orange's ADCs: Lieutenant Henry Webster, 9th Light Dragoons);
 Firing the shot that wounded the Prince of Orange during the Battle of Waterloo, forcing him to retire from the field (in reality, this shot was most likely fired by a French skirmisher);
 Taking command of a regiment in driving off the advance of the French Imperial Guard at the Battle of Waterloo (the regiments who actually held off the Imperial Guard are in the novel as well);
 Saving the Duke of Wellington from two assassination attempts in Paris (Cornwell explains that the first attempt happened, though the shooter simply missed, while the second is fictional and based on a likely deliberate fire that broke out in a house Wellington had been in days earlier).

Novels, short stories, and non-fiction
The first book was written in 1981, with Richard Sharpe in Spain at the Talavera Campaign in 1809. The next seven books were written in order up to Sharpe's Siege in 1814. The  novel Sharpe's Rifles was written next, set earlier in 1809 at the time of the retreat from Corunna, Spain. The next four books follow on from Sharpe's Siege up to Sharpe's Devil, set in 1820–21. Then came Sharpe's Battle set between Sharpe's Gold and Sharpe's Company (set in 1811). Cornwell then moved to the beginning of Sharpe's army career in British India with Sharpe's Tiger set in 1799, beginning a series of three books, closing with Sharpe's Prey set in 1807. Cornwell followed this with two novels and four short stories which lie between Sharpe's Rifles (1809) and Sharpe's Devil (1820–21).

Cornwell published the non-fiction book Waterloo: The History of Four Days, Three Armies and Three Battles in September 2014, timely for the 200th anniversary of the Battle of Waterloo.

Sharpe possibly appears in Simon Scarrow's The Fields of Death, although his surname is not confirmed.  A major in the 95th Rifles called Richard and who, "unusually for an officer... carries a rifle like his men," delivers captured French orders to the Duke of Wellington indicating the enemy's intention to fall back to Vitoria.

See also

 List of Sharpe series characters
 Richard Sharpe stories
 Sharpe (TV series)
 South Essex Regiment
 The Starbuck Chronicles
 The Flashman Papers

References

Citations

General and cited references

External links
 
 The Sharpe page at Bernard Cornwell's official site
 Yesterday's Sharpe section

Book series introduced in 1981
Cultural depictions of Arthur Wellesley, 1st Duke of Wellington
Historical novels by series
Novels about orphans
Rifle Brigade (Prince Consort's Own)
Sharpe characters
Fictional soldiers
Fictional thieves
Fictional farmers